Thomas Cheesman (1816 – 15 August 1874) was an English amateur cricketer who played in one first-class cricket match for Kent County Cricket Club in 1854.

Cheesman was born in Luddesdown in Kent in 1816, one of seven children of William and Henrietta Cheesman. He worked as a solicitor in Gravesend and played most of his cricket in the town, including for Gravesend Cricket Club between 1840 and around 1863. His only first-class appearance was at the town's Bat and Ball Ground in 1854 against a United England Eleven, one of fifteen players on the Kent team. Cheesman opened the batting for Kent and scored 14 runs in his first innings but was out for a duck in Kent's second innings. He is also known to have played in non-first-class matches for Gentlemen of Kent sides.

Cheesman is not believed to have married. He died at Margate in 1874.

Notes

References

External links

1816 births
1874 deaths
English cricketers
Kent cricketers
People from Gravesham (district)
People from Margate